This is a list of the twin towns, sister cities and other international relationships of Metro Manila, composed of cities with which the National Capital Region of the Philippines, Metro Manila and its local government units are twinned geographically and politically, with the goal of fostering human contact and cultural interchange.

Region
The following cities have been declared twin towns and sister cities of the capital region.

M
Metro Manila
 Shanghai, China

Cities
The following cities have been declared twin towns and sister cities of the capital city and surrounding local government units in Metro Manila.

C
Caloocan
 Calamba, Laguna
 Malabon, Philippines
 San Jose Del Monte, Bulacan
 Incheon, South Korea

L
Las Piñas
 Markham, Ontario, Canada
 Sochi, Russia
 Philadelphia, United States

M
Makati
 Balatan, Camarines Sur, Philippines
 Cluj-Napoca, Romania
 Famy, Laguna, Philippines
 Infanta, Quezon, Philippines
 Itogon, Benguet, Philippines
 Los Angeles, California, United States, since 1992
 Vladivostok, Primorsky Krai, Russia

Malabon
 Jung District, Daejeon, South Korea

Mandaluyong
 Dubai, United Arab Emirates

Manila
 Acapulco, Mexico, since 1969
 Beijing, China, since 2005
 Dili, East Timor
 Guangzhou, China
 Haifa, Israel
 Honolulu, Hawaii, United States, since 1980
 Maui County, Hawaii, United States,  as a Friendship city since 1994
 Moscow, Russia
 Montreal, Quebec, Canada, since 2005
 Nantan, Kyoto, Japan
 Sacramento, California,  United States
 Saipan, Northern Mariana Islands
 San Francisco, California,  United States
 Taipei,  Taiwan
 Takatsuki, Osaka, Japan
 Winnipeg, Manitoba, Canada, since 1979
 Yokohama, Japan

Marikina
 Alaminos, Pangasinan, Philippines 
 Bacolod, Philippines 
 Brampton, Ontario, Canada,  as a Friendship city since 2005 
 Yeongdo District, Busan, South Korea, as a Friendship city since 2012 
 Davao City, Philippines
 Iloilo City, Philippines 
 Sakai, Ibaraki, Japan

Muntinlupa
 Liuzhou, China
 Piteşti, Romania
 Staffanstorp, Sweden
 Takasaki, Gunma, Japan
 Carson, California, United States

P
Parañaque
 Haeundae, South Korea, since 2015
 Carson, California, United States, since 2018

Pasay
 Jecheon, South Korea
 Tainan City, Taiwan, since September 10, 1980
 Union City, California, United States

Pasig
 Marugame, Kagawa, Japan
 South San Francisco, California, United States

Q
Quezon City
 Alicia, Isabela, Philippines
 Banaybanay, Davao Oriental, Philippines
 Chiba City, Chiba, Japan
 Cotabato City, Philippines
 Davao City, Philippines
 General Santos, Philippines
 Iloilo City, Philippines
 Kenosha, Wisconsin, United States
 La Trinidad, Benguet, Philippines
 Maui County, Hawaii, United States, since 1970
 Naga, Camarines Sur, Philippines
 New Westminster, British Columbia, Canada
 Puerto Princesa, Philippines
 Pura, Tarlac, Philippines
 Sadanga, Mountain Province, Philippines
 Salt Lake City, Utah, United States
 Shenyang, China
 Taipei, Taiwan
 Wao, Lanao del Sur, Philippines

S
San Juan 
 Maui County, Hawaii, United States, since 1991 as a Friendship City
 Santa Barbara, California, United States

T
Taguig
 Bacolod, Philippines
 Blacktown, Australia
 Iloilo City, Philippines
 Tabaco, Philippines
 Vigan, Philippines

V
Valenzuela
 Bucheon, South Korea, since June 25, 2008
 Bustos, Bulacan, Philippines
 Kauai, Hawaii, United States

Municipality

P
Pateros
 Pateros, Washington, United States, since 2013

See also
 Lists of twin towns and sister cities
 List of twin towns and sister cities in Asia
 List of sister cities in the Philippines

References

Metro Manila
Culture in Metro Manila
Metro Manila-related lists